Will Clarke may refer to:

 Will Clarke (American football) (born 1991), American football player
 Will Clarke (novelist) (born 1970), American novelist
 Will Clarke (triathlete) (born 1985), British triathlete
 Will Clarke (cyclist) (born 1985), Australian road cyclist

See also 
 Will Clark (disambiguation)
 William Clarke (disambiguation)